Bolwarra or Bolwarrah may refer to:

Places in Australia
 Bolwarra, New South Wales 
 Bolwarra Heights, New South Wales, a suburb of Maitland, New South Wales
 Bolwarra, Queensland, a locality in the Shire of Mareeba
 Bolwarra, Victoria, 8 km north of Portland, Victoria.
 Bolwarrah, Victoria, 20 km east of Ballarat

Other
 Eupomatia laurina, a shrub originating from Australia and New Guinea, providing an Australian spice, also called ‘native guava’